Eaton Bank Academy (formerly Eaton Bank School) is a co-educational secondary school with academy status located in the town of Congleton in Cheshire, England.

History 
The school was formed in 2000 after the reduction of the area's three schools to two larger schools (the previous schools being Dane Valley High School, Heathfield High School and Westlands High School). The school gained academy status in September 2012.

In 2013 Eaton Bank Academy announced plans for a £3 million multi-purpose sports centre, these plans were announced as part of Congleton's attempt to secure it's Olympic legacy.

In 2019 ministerial approval was given for Eaton Bank Academy to join Fallibroome Trust.

Ofsted 
In an Ofsted inspection in 2015 the report classified the school as 'Good with outstanding features'. The report rated both 'leadership and management' and student 'behaviour and welfare' as Outstanding. The inspectors reported; "There is an exceptional ethos and climate for learning within the school".

See also

Congleton High School

References

External links
School website

Secondary schools in the Borough of Cheshire East
Educational institutions established in 2000
Academies in the Borough of Cheshire East
2000 establishments in England